This is a list of the 81 members of the European Parliament for Spain during the 1989 to 1994 session.

List

zReferences

1989
List
Spain